My Everything is the third single album by South Korean girl group The Grace, released on November 3, 2006 by SM Entertainment. The single contains five tracks, including the lead single of the same name "열정(My Everything)" and cover version of George Michael's single "Faith". 

Following the release of the single, they started addition The Grace in their Korean and Chinese name. The lead single music video was starring by Super Junior's Kibum and Girls' Generation's Yoona as the main role.

Although promoted, the single debuted at #30 on the Music Industry Association of Korea's November 2006 charts, with 2,447 copies sold.

Track listing

References

External links
  Official Website

2006 singles
South Korean songs
SM Entertainment singles
Korean-language songs
The Grace (band) songs
2006 songs
Songs written by Yoo Young-jin